The ZIM file format is an open file format that stores wiki content for offline usage. Its primary focus is the contents of Wikipedia and other Wikimedia projects. The format allows for the compression of articles. ZIM file can also contain full-text search indices and other auxiliary files. 

In addition to the open file format, the openZIM project provides support for an open-source ZIM reader called Kiwix.

ZIM stands for "Zeno IMproved", as it replaces the earlier Zeno file format.  Its file compression uses LZMA2, as implemented by the xz-utils library, and, more recently, Zstandard. The openZIM project is sponsored by Wikimedia CH, and supported by the Wikimedia Foundation.

References

External links
 Official website of the openZIM project
 The reference collection of ZIM files

Archive formats
Wikipedia
Open formats